Too Old to Rock 'n' Roll: Too Young to Die! is the ninth studio album released by British band Jethro Tull, recorded in December 1975 and released in 1976. It is the first album to include bassist John Glascock who also contributes with backing vocals. Too Old to Rock 'n' Roll: Too Young to Die! is the last Jethro Tull concept album, which follows the story of Ray Lomas, an ageing rocker who finds fame with the changes of musical trends. It was Jethro Tull's only album of the 1970s not to achieve Gold certification.

Overview

Recording
Like their previous album, Minstrel in the Gallery, the band recorded the album in the Maison Rouge Mobile Studio. They recorded "Too Old to Rock 'n' Roll: Too Young to Die" and "The Chequered Flag (Dead or Alive)" along with the outtakes "Salamander's Rag Time", "Commercial Traveller" and "Advertising Man (Unfinished backing track)" on 19 and 20 November 1975, "Big Dipper" on 3 January 1976, "Pied Piper" and "Quizz Kid" on 4 and 5 January, "Taxi Grab", "Pied Piper", "Crazed Institution" and "Old Rocker (Quizz Kid intro)" on 8 January, "From a Dead Beat to an Old Greaser", "Salamander" and "Pied Piper" along with the outtake "A Small Cigar (acoustic version)" on 12 January, and finally "Bad-Eyed and Loveless" along with the outtake "A Small Cigar (orchestral version)" on 27 January 1976.

Background
Jethro Tull frontman Ian Anderson says the point of the album was to illustrate how his style of music may go out of popularity with every other fashion and fad, but he is determined that if he sticks to it, everything comes back around and the style will rise again.

Ian Anderson explains that the concept came from the turmoil of the rise of the punk movement, and was not meant to be autobiographical of him as an ageing songwriter, although "some members of the press took the album as our attempt to 'get with' the punks". Anderson also stated that the basis of the concept is "to point out that this business [music, fashion] is cyclic, and that if you stick around long enough, you do come into fashion again."

Concept
Originally intended to be a rock musical, the story would follow an ageing and retired rock star named Ray Lomas - winning money in a 'Quizz' show, trying to commit suicide and waking up years later to find out that the grease fashion has returned. Although much of the album concept is only explained in the cartoons printed in the sleeves, there are changes in the plot or in details between the cartoons and the music.

A clip of the title track was released in the Slipstream video, which returned to much of the original album's concept.

Critical reception

Rolling Stone complained about the "muddled story" of the album, saying that "Ian Anderson should stick to music, because he most definitely is not a storyteller." Nevertheless, the same review praised Anderson's skill at musical composition, and the guitar solos of Martin Barre.

Chris Welch, writing for Melody Maker, gave a mixed review, saying that he "long(ed) for the beat of Barriemore Barlow to break free, or the guitar of Martin Barre to swoop", at the same time he praised Anderson's poetics.

AllMusic's review called the album "one of the minor efforts in the [Jethro Tull] catalogue".

Releases
Too Old to Rock 'n' Roll: Too Young to Die! was remastered in 2002 and the CD version contains two bonus tracks that were cut from the original LP, "Small Cigar" and "Strip Cartoon".

The album has been released in a box set called Too Old to Rock 'n' Roll: Too Young to Die! - The TV Special Edition in November 2015. The box set contains previously unreleased tracks and outtakes of songs from the album remixed by Steven Wilson, besides an 80-page booklet telling the story of the recording and the video of the special TV show recorded in 1976 and available officially for the first time.

Track listing

1976 original release

2002 Remaster

 "A Small Cigar" originally appeared on the 1993 album Nightcap.
 "Strip Cartoon" was first released as the b-side of the 1977 single "The Whistler" (from the Songs From The Wood album); it made its LP & CD debut on the 1988 box set 20 Years of Jethro Tull.

2015 40th Anniversary TV special edition

Personnel
Jethro Tull
 Ian Anderson – lead vocals, acoustic guitar, flute, harmonica, additional electric guitar and percussion
 Martin Barre – electric guitar
 John Evan – piano, keyboards
 John Glascock – backing vocals, bass guitar
 Barriemore Barlow – drums, percussion

Additional musicians
 Dee Palmer – saxophone (on track 5), Vako Orchestron, piano (on track 11)
 Maddy Prior – backing vocals (on track 8)
 Angela Allen – backing vocals (on tracks 2 & 7)
Orchestrations by Dee Palmer.
Orchestra conducted by Dee Palmer.

Additional personnel
 Robin Black – sound engineer
 Michael Farrell – cover design, illustrations
 David Gibbons – design, illustrations

Charts

References

External links
 Jethro Tull - Too Old to Rock 'n' Roll: Too Young to Die! (1976) album review by William Ruhlmann, credits & releases at AllMusic.com
 Jethro Tull - Too Old to Rock 'n' Roll: Too Young to Die! (1976) album releases & credits at Discogs.com
 Jethro Tull - Too Old to Rock 'n' Roll: Too Young to Die! (1976) album credits & user reviews at ProgArchives.com
 Jethro Tull - Too Old to Rock 'n' Roll: Too Young to Die! (1976) album review by vanderb0b at SputnikMusic.com
 Jethro Tull - Too Old to Rock 'n' Roll: Too Young to Die! (1976/2002 Remaster) album to be listened as stream at Play.Spotify.com
 Jethro Tull - Too Old to Rock 'n' Roll: Too Young to Die! (1976/2015 The TV Special Edition remixed by Steven Wilson) album to be listened as stream at Play.Spotify.com

Jethro Tull (band) albums
1976 albums
Concept albums
Island Records albums
Chrysalis Records albums
Rock operas
Capitol Records albums
Albums produced by Ian Anderson